Rishton Ki Dor is a Pakistani television soap opera which aired on Geo Entertainment.
First episode was aired on 20 October 2015. Serial stars newcomers Zeenia Bukhari, Muneeb Butt, Maham Amir and Pakistani model Yasir Shah who had previously worked in Indian serials.

Cast
Zeenia Bukhari as Hania
Hina Rizvi as Sofia
Maham Amir as Zara
Yasir Shah as Kabeer
Muneeb Butt as Zain
Ghazala Butt as Sajida
Asad Siddiqui as Umair
Hina Umer as Sumbul
Adnan Shah Tipu as Sikandar
Noshaba Javed as Suraiya

References

2010s television soap operas
Pakistani television shows
Pakistani television soap operas
Geo TV original programming